Libušín is a town in Kladno District in the Central Bohemian Region of the Czech Republic. It has about 3,300 inhabitants.

Geography
It lies mostly in the Prague Plateau.

History
According to archaeological finds, there was a Slavic settlement already in the 6th–7th century. At the end of the 9th century, a gord was built here. The first written mention of Libušín is from 1052. In 1277, it was donated to the Ostrov Monastery by King Ottokar II. In 1514, the Martinic family bought Libušín and owned it until the 20th century.

In 1919, Libušín became a town, but for the period 1961–2006 it lost its town status.

Economy
In 1775, black coal was found near Libušín. The coal mining in the municipal territory started in 1885, when the first of three mines in Libušín was opened. The coal mining increased the town's population and accelerated its development. The coal was mined here until 2002.

Culture
Libušín is known for its annual huge medieval festival with the biggest medieval historical reenactment in the country and one of the biggest in Europe. It was established in 1991. The battle is fictional and not based on a historical event.

Sights

The Church of Saint George was probably founded in the 10th century in the gord's area. In 1650 the church took its current Baroque shape. Its location away from the town centre was the reason why another church was built in 1908 – the neo-Gothic Church of Saint Procopius.

The area of Church of Saint George and remains of the gord include a wooden bell tower built in 1500.

The mining tower together with the mining building were inscribed on the list of technical cultural monuments.

Notable people
Jiří Pauer (1919–2007), composer
Josef Frolík (1928–1989), CIA spy
Zdeněk Herman (1934–2021), physical chemist

References

External links

Cities and towns in the Czech Republic
Populated places in Kladno District